{{Infobox writer
| name         = Kyuka Lilymjok
| image        = 
| caption      = 
| birth_name   = Adamu Kyuka Usman Lilymjok
| birth_date   = 
| birth_place  = Bafai-Kanai, Kaduna State, Nigeria
| death_date   = 
| death_place  = 
| occupation   = Professor of lawPhilosopherPolitical thinkerWriterAcademic
| nationality  = Nigerian
| alma_mater   = Bayero University, Kano (BA, LLM)Ahmadu Bello University, Zaria (PhD)
| period       = 
| genre        = 
| movement     = 
| notableworks = Hope in Anarchy (2005)Sieged (2011)Bivan's House (2011)| spouse       = 
| children     = 
| awards       = 
| module       =
}}

Kyuka Lilymjok (or Adamu Kyuka Usman, Adamu Kyuka Usman Lilymjok, born 24 September 1965, Bafai-Kanai, Niɡeria) is a Niɡerian writer, political thinker, philosopher and professor of Law at Ahmadu Bello University (ABU), Zaria, Nigeria.

Early life and education
Lilymjok was born 24 September 1965, in Bafai, Kanai District, southern Kaduna State, Nigeria. He attended Government Secondary School, Katagum, Bauchi State, where he obtained a West African School Certificate (WASC) and proceeded to Bayero University Kano where he graduated with an LL.B. Second Class Honours (Upper Division) in 1990 and a Bachelor of Law (BL) from the Nigerian Law School, Victoria Island, Lagos in 1991. He was successfully called to the Nigerian Bar within the same year. Within a short interval, he enrolled for a master's degree programme in law and graduated with a Master of Laws (LL.M) in 1998 and subsequently obtained a doctorate degree (PhD) in 2005 from Ahmadu Bello University, Zaria.

Positions held (past and present)
As at May 2016, he was the Special Assistant to President Muhammadu Buhari on legal matters, research and documentation. He reportedly spoke as a keynote speaker on 16 May 2016, at the Nigeria Bar Association (NBA) Kaduna Branch Law Week at the canopies, U/Rimi, Kaduna, Kaduna State on the present administration's fight against corruption.The Nation and Vanguard News amidst other Nigerian newspapers, reported in June 2016, Prof. Adamu Kyuka Usman's appointment as Secretary of a technical committee on fuel price hike inaugurated by the Nigerian Federal government, and also presented him as a representative of the Office of the Secretary to the Government of the Federation. 

He is currently a Literary Resource Person and Legal Consultant at Global network Toronto, Canada.Vanguard News on 22 May 2020 reported the appointment of Prof. Adamu Usman by the Nigerian president, Gen. Buhari (rtd.), in a letter titled, "Appointment as Chairman of the Governing Board of the Universal Basic Education Commission (UBEC), signed by the Minister of Education, Malam Adamu Adamu on 15 May 2020 with the appointment to take effect on 14 May 2020, lasting for the next four years. It was also reported that until his appointment, he was in the department of Commercial Law, Ahmadu Bello University (ABU), Zaria.

Political engagements
In 2002, Adamu Kyuka Usman published an epic on a man whom he admired and possibly still admires, the former Nigerian military Head-of-State, Gen. Muhammadu Buhari (rtd.), titled  Muhammadu Buhari: The Spirit of a Man, and was part of the founding members of The Buhari Organization (TBO) formed against the 2003 presidential polls on which Gen. Buhari (rtd.) would contest under the All Nigeria People's Party (ANPP) flag, against the incumbent Nigerian president, a candidate of the People's Democratic Party (PDP), Chief Olusegun Obasanjo, GCFR. He afterwards reportedly served as secretary to the arm organization responsible for the formulation of the political vision and mission of the presidential aspirant, the Integrity Network Group.

After the elections, he was also part of the legal team which stood by Gen. Muhammadu Buhari (rtd.) to challenge the result of the 2003 presidential election in the Supreme Court, said to have been won by the incumbent president of Nigeria, Chief Olusegun Obasanjo, GCFR. After the final judgement was passed in favour of the incumbent president and the PDP, he published a critique to show his displeasure in the ruling, titled:  Buhari Vs Obasanjo: Law and Justice on the Cross .

When Gen. Buhari (rtd.) moved to the newly formed All Progressives Congress (APC) in which he was to contest for the fifth consecutive time against the incumbent president, Dr. Goodluck Ebele Jonathan, GCFR, Prof. Usman's alliance followed suit and was a core member of the new party and supporter of the man he so admired.

He served as Deputy Director of the Policy, Research and Strategy Committee of the council in the 2019 presidential polls in which now President Muhammadu Buhari was contesting for a second term in office, and served also as the APC Returning Officer for Kaduna State in the 2019 gubernatorial elections in which Mallam Nasir Musa El-Rufai, GCON, ran for re-election and was reported to have won, even though the issue was strong contested in court by the PDP candidate, just as in the case of the presidential election.

Publications
Adamu Kyuka Usman has many works of fiction in his name and he was one of the two Association of Nigerian Authors (ANA)/Jacaranda literary prize award winners for Prose through his book Sieged, in the year 2011.

Literature
Books
Hope in Anarchy (2005)
The Village Tradesman (2005)
The Unknown Vulture (2009)
The Butcher's Wife (2011)
The Death of Eternity (2012)
My Head Master (2017)
The Heart of Jacob (2017)
The Lord Mammon (2012)
Bivan's House (2011)
A Journey: From Hell to Heaven (2017)
Sieged (2011)
The Lone Piper and the Birds' Case (2012)
The Disappointed Three (2012)
The Mad Professor of Babeldu (2013)
Last Saints (2005)

Manuscripts
The World Conference in Heaven
Twillight for a Vulture
Gods of My Fathers
Return of the Oracle

Law
Nigeria Oil and Gas Law (2017)
Environmental Protection Law and Practice (2017)
The Theory and Practice of International Economy (2017)
Law and Practice of Equity and Trust (2004)
Nigeria Oil and Gas Industry: Institutions, Issues, Laws and Policies (2018)

Others
Muhammadu Buhari: The Spirit of a Man (2002)Buhari Vs. Obasanjo: Law and Justice on the Cross (2007)The Oracles of Global Economic Recession V. The Witches of Free Trade published'' (2008– 2009)

References

1965 births
Academic staff of Ahmadu Bello University
20th-century Nigerian lawyers
Nigerian writers

Living people
Atyap people 
People from Kaduna State
21st-century Nigerian lawyers